A toaster is a device to cook bread

Toaster, or The Toaster, may also refer to:

Technology
 Toaster (software), a self-contained software package ("appliance") meant for electronic distribution or for burning onto CD-ROM
 Video Toaster, a live video-production suite from NewTek used on Amiga
 EMD AEM-7, an electric railroad locomotive commonly nicknamed Toaster
 Toaster, in Microsoft codename jargon, a hardware equivalent of fictional entities used in documentation and sample code as placeholders to be redefined by third-party developers

Other uses
 The Toasters, a ska band
 Cylon (Battlestar Galactica), fictional characters in Battlestar Galactica referred to as "Toasters"
 Bennelong Apartments, in Sydney, Australia, colloquial name "The Toaster" or "Toaster building"
 Electronic organ, sometimes referred to as a toaster
 The Toaster, a character in The Brave Little Toaster (novel), a children's book
 Toaster Nsabata, a Zambian football goalkeeper

See also
 Toasting, talking or chanting over a rhythm or beat by a deejay (Jamaican)
 Toast (disambiguation)
 Towcester, a place in Northamptonshire, England.
 Poe Toaster, a mysterious figure who pays an annual tribute to American author Edgar Allan Poe